Ireland competed at the 2008 Summer Paralympics in Beijing. Ireland sent 45 athletes, competing in 9 sports. The country's flagbearer at the Games' opening ceremony was Patrice Dockery.

Medallists

Sports

Archery

|-
|align=left|Sean Heary
|align=left|Men's individual compound
|652
|20
|W 108-104
|W 113-112
|L 99-113
|colspan=3|did not advance
|}

Athletics

Men's track

Men's field

Women's track

Women's field

Boccia

Cycling

Men's road

Men's track

Women's road

Women's track

Equestrian

Football 7-a-side

The men's football 7-a-side team didn't win any medals; they were 6th out of 8 teams.

Players
Aidan Brennan
Kieran Patrick Devlin
Paul Dollard
Luke Evans
Mark Gerard Jones
Darren Kavanagh
Derek Michael Malone
Joseph James Markey
Brian McGillivary
Gary Messett
Alan O'Hara
Finbarr O'Riordan

Tournament

5th-8th place semi-finals

5th-6th place match

Sailing

Five Irish athletes competed in the following events in sailing:
 Two-Person Keelboat - SKUD18
 Three-Person Keelboat - Sonar

Swimming

Ireland sent six representatives in swimming, including Dave Malone, Ellen Keane and Darragh McDonald.

Table tennis

See also
2008 Summer Paralympics
Ireland at the Paralympics
Ireland at the 2008 Summer Olympics

References

External links
Beijing 2008 Paralympic Games Official Site
International Paralympic Committee
"Speech by Mr Martin Cullen T.D. Minister for Arts, Sport and Tourism at the announcement of the Irish Team for the Beijing 2008 Paralympic Games", Department of Arts, Sport and Tourism, Irish government website
"Paralympics: Gold fever", Herald, September 3, 2008

Nations at the 2008 Summer Paralympics
2008
Paralympics